Herbert Browne may refer to:
Herbert John Charles Browne (1923–2015), British businessman
Herbert Browne (designer) of Glen Magna Farms and Derby Summer House
Herbert Browne (tennis), played in 1954 U.S. National Championships – Men's Singles

See also
Herbert Brown (disambiguation)